John Aġnaqłuk Lincoln (born December 17, 1981) is an American politician who served as a member of the Alaska House of Representatives from 2018 to 2021 from the 40th district. He was appointed by the governor before winning a full term in the 2018 election.

Early life and education
John Aġnaqłuk Lincoln was born on December 17, 1981, in Kotzebue, Alaska. He is a member of the Iñupiat group of Alaska Natives.  He was a valedictorian of his Kotzebue High School class, graduating in 1999. He went on to get a bachelor's degree from Stanford University.

Early career
Lincoln spent 15 years working with information technology infrastructure in Northwestern Alaska before moving to corporate governance and politics. He served as Vice President of Business Development for NANA Regional Corporation.

Alaska House of Representatives
Lincoln was chosen by Governor Bill Walker to replace Dean Westlake, who resigned following sexual assault allegations. Upon his decision, Walker said: 

Most of Lincoln's policies are center-left. In 2019 he became an independent and continued to caucus with the Democrats.

2018 election
Lincoln was elected to serve a full term in the 2018 Alaska House of Representatives elections with 59.8 percent of the vote.

References

1981 births
21st-century American politicians
Alaska Democrats
Alaska Independents
Inupiat people
Living people
Members of the Alaska House of Representatives
People from Northwest Arctic Borough, Alaska
Stanford University alumni